Norfolk House, 31 St James's Square, Westminster, was built between 1748 and 1752 as his London townhouse by Edward Howard, 9th Duke of Norfolk (1686–1777) to the design of Matthew Brettingham (1699–1769), "the Elder", and was demolished in 1938. His country house and main seat was Worksop Manor in Nottinghamshire. Norfolk House was built on a site formerly occupied by two houses, namely St Albans House, the residence of the Earl of St Albans (purchased by Thomas Howard, 8th Duke of Norfolk in 1722), and the other the residence of John Belasyse, 1st Baron Belasyse (1614–1689) (purchased by the 9th Duke of Norfolk in 1748). Both these houses were demolished in 1748 by the 9th Duke of Norfolk in preparation for his new house.

St Albans House
St Albans House was a royal residence for a short time, after the 9th Duke of Norfolk offered it to Frederick, Prince of Wales, following his marriage in 1736 to Princess Augusta of Saxe-Gotha. The couple lived there 1737–1741, and their son King George III was born in the house. The family moved to Leicester House in 1742, which remained the prince's home until his death nine years later, and that of his widow until her death in 1772.

Norfolk House
Norfolk House remained in the ownership of the Dukes of Norfolk until 1938 when it was pulled down and replaced by an office building. During the Second World War this building served as offices for senior officers from a variety of Allied armed forces, including the Canadian 1st Army and the Supreme Headquarters Allied Expeditionary Force under General Dwight D. Eisenhower. Two plaques on the exterior of the building commemorate the role of the building in the War. The 1930s building was fully refitted in the years before 2019. The office space became obsolete for modern requirements and in 2019 plans were submitted to demolish it and rebuild at a cost of £60 million in line with modern requirements.

Music Room
Parts of the interior of the eighteenth-century house survive, having been removed before demolition, including the Music Room, designed by Giovanni Battista Borra for the ninth Duke's wife Mary Blount, now displayed in the Victoria and Albert Museum, restored and redecorated to its original scheme of brilliant white paintwork with gilt, carved woodwork.

Gallery

See also 
 List of demolished buildings and structures in London

References

External links
 Detailed history and description - from the Survey of London.
 Photograph of 1932 - from the Survey of London.
 

Royal residences in the United Kingdom
Houses completed in 1722
Former houses in the City of Westminster
St James's
1722 establishments in England
1938 disestablishments in England
Demolished buildings and structures in London
Buildings and structures demolished in 1938
Frederick, Prince of Wales
Howard family (English aristocracy)